"If I Fall You're Going Down with Me" is a song written by Matraca Berg and Annie Roboff, and recorded by American country music group Dixie Chicks.  It was released in February 2001 as the sixth single from their August 1999 album Fly.  The song peaked at number 3 on the U.S. country charts.  It also reached number 38 on the Billboard Hot 100.

Chart performance
"If I Fall You're Going Down with Me" debuted at number 42 on the U.S. Billboard Hot Country Singles & Tracks for the chart week of February 24, 2001.

Year-end charts

References

2001 singles
1999 songs
The Chicks songs
Song recordings produced by Paul Worley
Songs written by Matraca Berg
Monument Records singles
Song recordings produced by Blake Chancey
Songs written by Annie Roboff